The 1st Battalion, Parachute Regiment (1 PARA), is a battalion of the British Army's Parachute Regiment. Along with various other regiments and corps from across the British Armed Forces, it is part of Special Forces Support Group.

A specialized airborne light infantry unit, the battalion as of 2006 has been the main contributor of manpower to the British Army's Parachute Regiment and is capable of a wide range of operations. Personnel regularly deploy outside the United Kingdom on operations and training, 1 PARA is part of Special Forces Support Group and regarded as the elite of the Parachute Regiment deployed to assist United Kingdom Special Forces in a supporting role as well as being the main part of the hunter force on SF selection.

All personnel complete the Pre Parachute Selection (P Company) course at the Infantry Training Centre Catterick Garrison, North Yorkshire (previously at Aldershot, Hampshire).

History

The 1st Battalion can trace its origins to 1940, when No. 2 Commando trained as parachutists. In 1941, the battalion, commanded by Lieutenant Colonel Ernest Down, was assigned to the 1st Parachute Brigade which also included the 2nd and 3rd Parachute Battalions. The 1st Parachute Brigade was part of the 1st Airborne Division and remained with it throughout the war.

The battalion took part in operations in Tunisia in late 1942 to May 1943, suffering heavy casualties. The battalion and the brigade took part in Operation Fustian, when the Allies invaded Sicily and, again, suffered heavy casualties and was withdrawn to England in late 1943 to train and prepare for the Allied invasion of France. The battalion wasn't used in the initial invasion on 6 June 1944, D-Day, but was held back in the UK in reserve in case any of the five invasion beaches encountered serious difficulties and needed support. The plan turned out not to be required. During the fighting in Normandy numerous plans to drop the 1st Airborne were formed, none of which came to fruition. Finally, in September 1944, the battalion, commanded by Lieutenant Colonel David Dobie, dropped into Arnhem the Netherlands with the rest of the 1st Airborne Division, as part of Operation Market Garden, where they suffered extremely heavy casualties and never saw combat again for the rest of the war.

After the war the battalion was reconstituted in 1946, and affiliated to the Brigade of Guards and served with the 6th Airborne Division in Palestine. It was disbanded in 1948, only to be reformed by the renumbering of the 4th/6th Battalion. The battalion was part of Operation Musketeer in 1956.

It also took part in the Cyprus Emergency fighting against EOKA. 

In the 1970s, the battalion first deployed to Northern Ireland in Operation Banner.  The battalion was involved in the Ballymurphy Massacre in August 1971, when 11 Catholic civilians were shot dead and many wounded over a two-day period. In January 1972, both the press and some in the Army accused the battalion of brutality against protesters outside Magilligan internment camp. A week later, on 30 January 1972, the battalion carried out the Bloody Sunday killings, when they opened fire on unarmed protesters in Derry, leaving 14 Catholic civilians dead and 13 wounded; the greatest killing of British subjects by government forces in one incident since the Irish War of Independence. The second official inquiry of the killings found 1st Para's actions "unjustified and unjustifiable". To date, none of the members of 1 Para have been prosecuted. The battalion was involved in another controversial shooting incident on 7 September 1972, when soldiers shot dead two Protestant civilians and wounded others in the Shankill area of Belfast. A unit of the Army's Ulster Defence Regiment (UDR) refused to carry out duties until the battalion was withdrawn from the Shankill.

The battalion was involved in the NATO operation in Kosovo in 1999, Operation Agricola. In 2003, they were deployed to the Persian Gulf for Operation Telic in Iraq where two multiples of No. 8 platoon fought their way out of the town of Majar al-Kabir. The battle occurred in June 2003, following the invasion of Iraq. During the battle, six Royal Military Policemen of 156 Provost Company were killed by a mob.

See also
 2nd Battalion, Parachute Regiment
 3rd Battalion, Parachute Regiment
 4th Battalion, Parachute Regiment
 Pathfinder Platoon
 List of Second World War British airborne battalions

References

External links
 1 PARA at Army.mod.uk
 Parachute Regiment War Dead
 Palace Barracks Memorial Garden 
 Ex-airborne Forces history page
 British Army Unit Locations 1945 onwards

British Parachute Regiment Battalions
Parachute Regiment
Military units and formations established in 1941
Military units and formations disestablished in 1948
Military units and formations established in 1948
Airborne units and formations of the United Kingdom
1941 establishments in the United Kingdom